Mount Nokogiri can refer to:
 Mount Nokogiri (Chiba) (Nokogiriyama), a mountain in Honshū, Japan.
 Mount Nokogiri (Hokkaidō) (Nokogiridake), a mountain in Hokkaidō, Japan.
 Mount Nokogiri (Akaishi) (Nokogiridake), in the Akaishi Mountains, forming part of the boundary between Nagano and Yamanashi Prefectures